is a passenger railway station located in the city of Kitaibaraki, Ibaraki Prefecture, Japan, operated by the East Japan Railway Company (JR East).

Lines
Ōtsukō Station is served by the Jōban Line, and is located 178.7 km from the official starting point of the line at Nippori Station.

Station layout
The station consists of one side platform and one island platform connected to the station building by a footbridge. The station is unattended.

Platforms

History
It was renamed to its present name on 10 May 1950. The station was absorbed into the JR East network upon the privatization of the Japanese National Railways (JNR) on 1 April 1987.

Passenger statistics
In fiscal 2019, the station was used by an average of 839 passengers daily (boarding passengers only).

Surrounding area
Ōtsu Post Office

Izura Beach

See also
 List of railway stations in Japan

References

External links

 Station information JR East Station Information 

Railway stations in Ibaraki Prefecture
Jōban Line
Railway stations in Japan opened in 1897
Kitaibaraki, Ibaraki